German Nebraskans are residents of the state of Nebraska who are of German ancestry. As of the 2000 U.S. Census, there are 738,894 German Americans living in Nebraska, making up 42.7% of the population, the third largest percentage of any state.

See also
Germans in Omaha, Nebraska

References

External links
Germans
German Russians